FilmTec Corporation was a US company established in Minnesota in 1977 that specialized in manufacturing the then new thin-film composite membranes used in water treatment applications. In August 1984, the company was acquired by Dow Chemical Company forming its Dow Water & Process Solutions business unit. In August 2017, FilmTec Corporation moved to DowDuPont, the company resulting from the merger of Dow and DuPont. On 2019, after the spin-offs of Dow and Corteva, FilmTec remained now part of DuPont Water Solutions, which is currently among the world's main membrane manufacturers.

Applications 
Applications include water purification, desalination, maple syrup, power generation and semiconductor manufacturing. Membranes and nanofiltration elements are made in different diameters and lengths. Industrial Reverse Osmosis membranes are typically 8-inch or 4-inch diameter.

References

External links 
 DuPont Water Solutions
 DuPont Water Solutions - Products

DuPont subsidiaries